Inverurie railway station is a railway station serving the town of Inverurie, Aberdeenshire, Scotland. It is managed by ScotRail and is on the Aberdeen to Inverness Line, which is mostly single track north of this point, between Kintore and Insch. It is measured  from Aberdeen.

History
The first station, then called Inverury Station, was opened on 20 September 1854 on the Great North of Scotland Railway main line which ran between Aberdeen Waterloo and Keith stations. In 1856 it became the junction station for the new Inverury and Old Meldrum Junction Railway branch line to Oldmeldrum. Renamed Inverurie Station in 1866, it was replaced in 1902 with a new building with three platforms at the present location close to the Inverurie Locomotive Works which was then being built. The station ceased to be a junction station in 1931 when the branch line was closed to passengers although freight traffic continued until 1966.

The station, Category B listed, is single storied and has a cupola with windvane.

Inverury and Old Meldrum Junction Railway 

The branch line to Oldmeldrum was opened by the Inverury and Old Meldrum Junction Railway company in 1856 and ran via  to  station (as it was then called).  was opened in 1866 and the company was absorbed into the Great North of Scotland Railway also in that year. A proposed extension to the Banff, Macduff and Turriff Junction Railway was considered but this was never built. The line was closed for passengers in 1931 and for freight in 1966.

Facilities 

Both platforms are equipped with shelters, help points and benches. Platform 1 also has a staffed ticket office, a ticket machine, separate waiting room and bike racks, which is also adjacent to the car park. There is a step-free access path at the end of the platforms, although there is also a footbridge in the centre of the station.

Passenger Volume 

The statistics cover twelve month periods that start in April.

Services 
There are additional shuttle services between here and Aberdeen to fill gaps in the service, giving 2 - 3 trains per hour between here and Aberdeen.

2018 improvements 
Service frequencies improved here from 2018 as part of the timetable recast funded by Transport Scotland. There are now at least two departures each hour to Aberdeen, with the existing through services to Inverness, Edinburgh & Glasgow maintained or increased in number. A £170 million project to upgrade the Aberdeen to Inverness route saw the line from Aberdeen redoubled in between June and August 2019.

References

Bibliography

External Links 

 

Category B listed buildings in Aberdeenshire
Railway stations in Aberdeenshire
Railway stations served by ScotRail
Listed railway stations in Scotland
Railway stations in Great Britain opened in 1854
Former Great North of Scotland Railway stations
1854 establishments in Scotland
Inverurie